Deshapran Mahavidyalaya, established in 2010,. is the government degree college in Durmut, Deshapran block, Purba Medinipur district. It offers undergraduate courses in arts. It is affiliated to Vidyasagar University.

Departments

Arts

Bengali
English
History
Education
Sanskrit
Political Science
Geography
Sociology

See also

References

External links
Deshapran Mahavidyalaya
Vidyasagar University
University Grants Commission
National Assessment and Accreditation Council

Colleges affiliated to Vidyasagar University
Educational institutions established in 2010
Universities and colleges in Purba Medinipur district
2010 establishments in West Bengal